Webster is an American sitcom produced by Emmanuel Lewis Entertainment Enterprises, Georgian Bay Productions, and Paramount Television, from 1983 to 1989, and was split into two different eras: The ABC era, which ran from 1983 to 1987, and the First-run syndication era, which ran from 1987 to 1989. A total of 150 episodes were produced (100 for ABC, and 50 for First-run syndication). Of the 150 episodes, six episodes, all from the ABC era, did not air until syndication. (These episodes—two from season 2 and four from season 3—are listed here with the seasons during which they were produced even though subsequent episodes of the following seasons aired earlier.) Some of the unaired episodes made their debut on ABC Daytime, which aired reruns of the show from December 22, 1986 to July 3, 1987.

Series overview 
Broadcast history
 September 1983–March 1985, ABC Friday 8:30–9:00
 March 1985–March 1987, ABC Friday 8:00–8:30
 March 1987–April 1987, ABC Friday 8:30–9:00
 May 1987, ABC Friday 8:00–8:30
 June 1987–August 1987, ABC Saturday 8:00–8:30
 August 1987–September 1987, ABC Friday 8:00–8:30

Episodes

Season 1 (1983–84)

Season 2 (1984–85)

Season 3 (1985–86)

Season 4 (1986–87)

Season 5 (1987–88)

Season 6 (1988–89)

References

External links
tv.com episode guide
SitcomsOnline episode guide
CBS Syndication bible information for the show: Includes all episodes listed by production order

Webster